The Legislative Council of Zulia (CLEZ), according to article 162 of the Constitution of Venezuela and article 38 of the Constitution of Zulia, is the state legislature of Zulia, a state of Venezuela. It consists of 15 deputies who are popularly elected from state legislatorial districts.

Current deputies
 Ángel Sánchez (A New Era)
 Javier Muñóz (A New Era)
 Manuel Peña (A New Era)
 Marlene Antúnez (A New Era)
 Ángel Monagas (A New Era)
 Eliseo Fermín (A New Era)
 William Sandrea A New Era
 Orlando Simancas (A New Era)
 Juan Carlos Velazco (Democratic Action)
 Adaulfo Carrasquero (Radical Cause)
 Egdar Oberto (For Social Democracy)
 Arnoldo Olivares (PSUV)
 Betty de Zuleta (PSUV)
 José Luis Acosta (PSUV)
 Javier Armato (Movimiento Indígena)

External links
 Official website

State legislatures of Venezuela
Government of Zulia
Zulia